Grachtenfestival is a 10-day classical music festival on Amsterdam's canals. It includes more than 150 musical performances from barges, architectural tours, and performances from the Royal Concertgebouw Orchestra. The first edition was organised in 1998. 

In 2015, the festival received over 54.000 visitors.

References

External links
Grachtenfestival website

Music festivals in the Netherlands
Classical music festivals in the Netherlands
Music in Amsterdam